Fannie may refer to:

 Fannie, a feminine given name (with a list of people named Fannie)
 Fannie (pilot boat), 19th-century pilot boat

See also
 Fanni (disambiguation)
 Fanny (disambiguation)